"Big Banana" is a song by Australian DJ and recording artist, Havana Brown featuring Dutch DJ R3hab and rapper Prophet. It was released in December 2012 as her fourth single overall, the second from her When the Lights Go Out EP. The song peaked at number one on the US Hot Dance Club Songs chart, and at number 18 on the Australian ARIA Singles Chart.

Song information

Background
In an interview, Brown stated the concept behind the song "Big Banana" as a way to objectify men after the "unrealistic shallow expectations" placed on girls, whereas she counters that in "Banana" by asking if the male has "a big banana." She added that the song was "a fun song for the girls and the gay boys." In an early March 2013 radio interview with Nova, Brown stated she was inspired by the 20 Fingers 1994' hit single "Short Dick Man", and that was the base of her creating the idea of recording "Big Banana."

Reception 
The song is met with mixed reviews. David from Feed Limmy stated he could only find one average song on the When the Lights Go Out EP, this being "Big Banana", calling the other songs "rubbish". "Big Banana" debuted at number 33 on the US Hot Dance Club Songs chart dated 15 December 2012, and peaked at number one in the issue dated 19 January 2013. In Australia, the track debuted on the ARIA Singles Chart at number 72 in the week of 4 March 2013 and moved up to number 38 the following week. It peaked at number 18 on 8 April 2013. "Big Banana" also entered the ARIA Dance Singles Chart at number 16 on 4 March 2013, and peaked at number two on 22 April 2013. It was certified platinum by the Australian Recording Industry Association (ARIA) for sales of 70,000 copies. One analyst described the song as promoting the objectification of men with macrophallism.

Music video
The music video for "Big Banana" was shot on 20 February 2013 at the Encino Hills in Los Angeles, United States. The video was directed by Icelandic software developer Einar Egilsson. Brown spoke about the music video: "The clip reflects everything about the song - it's fun, upbeat, tongue-in-cheek; it's dirty but fun at the same time." American model and actor Nick Baga plays her love interest in the music video. The music video premiered on 15 March 2013 on V-Music.

Track listing

Charts and certification

Weekly charts

Year-end charts

Certifications

Release history

See also
 List of number-one dance singles of 2013 (U.S.)

References 

2012 singles
Havana Brown (musician) songs
Songs written by Bilal Hajji
2101 Records singles
Island Records singles
Songs written by Havana Brown (musician)
2012 songs
Songs written by AJ Junior